Live at CBGB's is the fourth live album by San Francisco-based punk rock band Flipper, released in 1997 by Overground, It was recorded May 14, 1983 at CBGB in New York City, is Flipper's fourth live album.

Track list
 If It Don't Fit Don't Force It
 The Lights, the Sounds, the Rhythm, the Noise
 Life
 In Life My Friends
 Ha Ha Ha
 I Saw You Shine
 If I Can't Be Drunk
 Hopelessly in Love
 Love Canal
 Sex Bomb

Personnel
 Ted Falconi – guitar
 Steve DePace – drums
 Bruce Loose – vocals, bass
 Bruno DeSmartass – vocals, bass

References

Flipper (band) albums
1997 live albums
Albums recorded at CBGB